Prionus lecontei is a species of longhorn beetle. It is found on the west coast of North America from British Columbia to Baja California.

References

Prioninae
Beetles of North America
Beetles described in 1912
Taxa named by Auguste Lameere